Mohammad Said Ibrahim Efendi Fayad (1921–2003) known as Said Fayad, was a Lebanese poet and literary journalist from the village of Ansar in the Nabatieh Governorate of southern Lebanon.

Personal life
Fayad was the eldest son of Ibrahim Efendi Fayad, a local notable who served as a district governor under the French mandate, and Lamia Ali Dhaher, niece of the poet and religious figure Sheikh Suleiman Dhaher, a prominent intellectual in the Nabatieh governorate.

Said was schooled in Nabatieh, Hasbaya, the Maqased in Saida and the Freres.

He married Badriya Fayad and they had eight children: Afaf (step-daughter), Talal, Hilal, Daad, Dalal, Dunia, Ghada and Randa.

He spent most of his career between Lebanon and Saudi Arabia and then after retirement lived in Switzerland, the United Kingdom and Morocco. He returned to Lebanon in the late 1990s where he died on 15 October 2003.

Career
Said began his career in Saudi Arabia with al-Riyad Magazine (Arabic الرياض) and Saudi Radio in Mecca. He then returned to Beirut as a correspondent for Saudi Radio and wrote for the newspapers al-Hadaf (Arabic الهدف) and al-Rased (Arabic الراصد)  from 1958 to 1968. His poems were published in numerous magazines including al-Wuroud (Arabic الورود), al-Irfan (Arabic العرفان) and al-Adeeb (Arabic الأديب).

He also produced some programmes for Lebanese radio, including Fairuz Shah (Arabic فيروز شاه) and Hamza al-Arab (Arabic حمزة العرب).

In 1963, he returned to Jeddah to work for the radio broadcasting office where he produced the daily radio programmes With the People (Arabic مع الناس), Wisdom of the Day (Arabic حكمة اليوم), and Afternoon Sun (Arabic شمس الأصيل) until his retirement in 1975 for medical reasons. He wrote the Saudi national anthem (بلادي بلادي منار الهدى]).

In 1975, he moved to London, then in 1985 to Switzerland. From 1990 to 1996 he lived in Morocco in a suburb of Casablanca, close to his eldest son.

He returned to Lebanon in the late 1990s where he continued to write poetry, as well as his memoirs.

Dr Pierre Khabbaz (د. بيار خباز) of the Lebanese University published a study of his works in 1998 (سعيد فياض شاعرا - دراسة جمالية نفسية).

Said Fayad Literary Prize

Since 2004, the Said Fayad Literary Prize (Arabic جائزة سعيد فيّاض للإبداع الشعري) has been awarded annually in Beirut to promote and encourage excellence in Arab poetry. The prize is worth 5,000,000 Lebanese Lira (US$3,333).

Poetry 
Major poetic works include: 
 Blossoms براعم 1951
 Bouquet 1955 عبير
 Clarion Call of Affection 1984 هتاف الوجدان

Prose
He produced two anthologies of articles and works in prose:
 Moving images 1956 صور متحركة
 On the paths of life 1985 على دروب الحياة

References

http://www.albabtainprize.org/Encyclopedia/poet/0648.htm
https://web.archive.org/web/20111025015118/http://en.alapn.com/index.php?threads_id=2498
http://www.ndu.edu.lb/lerc/News/duniataan.htm

1921 births
2003 deaths
People from Nabatieh District
Lebanese male poets
Lebanese journalists
20th-century Lebanese poets
20th-century male writers
20th-century journalists
Lebanese expatriates in Saudi Arabia
Lebanese expatriates in Switzerland
Lebanese expatriates in the United Kingdom
Expatriates in Morocco